Mian Atta Muhammad Manika is a Pakistani Punjabi politician who was a Member of the Provincial Assembly of the Punjab, from 2002 to May 2018.

Early life and education
He was born on 10 October 1945.

He has the degree of Master of Arts which he received from Government College University , Lahore in 1966.

Political career

He was elected to the Provincial Assembly of the Punjab as a candidate of Pakistan Muslim League (J) from Constituency PP-159 Okara in 1993 Pakistani general election.

Manika was elected to the National Assembly of Pakistan from Constituency NA-113 Okara-IV in 1989 where he remained until 1990.

He was re-elected to the Provincial Assembly of the Punjab as a candidate of Pakistan Muslim League (Q) (PML-Q) from Constituency PP-227 (Pakpattan-I) in 2002 Pakistani general election.

He was re-elected to the Provincial Assembly of the Punjab as a candidate of PML-Q from Constituency PP-227 (Pakpattan-I) in 2008 Pakistani general election.

He was re-elected to the Provincial Assembly of the Punjab as a candidate of Pakistan Muslim League (N) from Constituency PP-227 (Pakpattan-I) in 2013 Pakistani general election. In June 2013, he was inducted into the provincial cabinet of Chief Minister Shahbaz Sharif and was made Provincial Minister of Punjab for Social Welfare and Baitul Maal where he served until November 2013. In November 2013, he was made Provincial Minister of Punjab for Auqaf and Religious Affairs where he served until November 2016. In a cabinet reshuffle in November 2016, he was made Provincial Minister of Punjab for Revenue.

References

Living people
Punjabi people
Punjab MPAs 2013–2018
1945 births
Pakistan Muslim League (N) MPAs (Punjab)
Punjab MPAs 2002–2007
Punjab MPAs 2008–2013
Punjab MPAs 1993–1996
Pakistani MNAs 1988–1990
Pakistan Muslim League (J) politicians
Maneka family
Government College University, Lahore alumni
Pakistan Muslim League (N) MNAs